Multistriatin is a pheromone of the elm bark beetle. It is a volatile compound released by a virgin female beetle when she has found a good source of food, such as an elm tree.

Potential applications 

Males beetles, which carry the fungus which causes Dutch elm disease, are attracted to the pheromone. Hence multistriatin could be used to trap beetles and so prevent the spread of the disease.

Stereochemistry 

The compound exists in several diastereomic forms, depending on the positions of the methyl groups. Only the natural stereoisomer, α-multistriatin, attracts the elm bark beetles.

References 

Pheromones
Oxygen heterocycles